Leucopogon oldfieldii is a species of flowering plant in the heath family Ericaceae and is endemic to the south-west of Western Australia. It is an erect or spreading shrub with lance-shaped leaves and dense spikes of white or pink, tube-shaped flowers.

Description
The flowers are arranged in short, dense spikes on the ends of branches or in upper leaf axils, the lower bracts leaf-like and longer than the bracteoles. The bracteoles are tapered and about half as long as the sepals. Flowering occurs from June to September.

Taxonomy
Leucopogon oldfieldii was first formally described in 1868 by George Bentham in Flora Australiensis from a specimen collected on the Darling Range by Augustus Frederick Oldfield. The specific epithet (oldfieldii) honours the collector of the type specimen.

Distribution and habitat
This leucopogon grows in sand on sandplains in the Avon Wheatbelt, Geraldton Sandplains, Jarrah Forest and Swan Coastal Plain bioregions of south-western Western Australia.

Conservation status
Leucopogon oldfieldii is listed as "not threatened" by the Government of Western Australia Department of Biodiversity, Conservation and Attractions.

References

oldfieldii
Ericales of Australia
Flora of Western Australia
Plants described in 1868
Taxa named by George Bentham